Crissey may refer to

People
Forrest Crissey, prolific early twentieth century novelist of Tattlings of a Retired Politician and writer for the Saturday Evening Post and Harpers Magazine
John Crissey III an Anglo-American film producer and lecturer
Marie Skodak Crissey, an American developmental psychologist

Places
Crissey, Jura, a commune in the French region of Franche-Comté
Crissey, Saône-et-Loire, a commune in the French region of Bourgogne